Segura Bridge is a Roman bridge connecting Segura, in Idanha-a-Nova, Portugal, to the Spanish municipality of Alcántara. The bridge was built over the Erges river, a tributary of the Tagus. It has five arches; only two of the original Roman arches, the ones closer to both river banks, survive to this day, with the rest being added during reconstructions in the 16th and 19th centuries. The stonemason work done during the 1571 reconstruction of two of the arches is considered to be "barely distinguishable" from the original.

See also
 List of Roman bridges
 List of bridges in Portugal

References

Sources

Further reading

Bridges in Portugal
Bridges in Castelo Branco District
Segura